The New Zealand Mixed Doubles Curling Championship is the national championship of mixed doubles curling (one man and one woman) in New Zealand. It has been held annually since 2007 and organized by New Zealand Curling Association.

List of champions and medallists
Team line-ups shows in order: woman, man, coach (if exists).

Medal record for curlers
(as of after 2020 championship)

See also
New Zealand Men's Curling Championship
New Zealand Women's Curling Championship
New Zealand Mixed Curling Championship

References

Curling competitions in New Zealand
Recurring sporting events established in 2007
2007 establishments in New Zealand
National curling championships
Mixed doubles curling
Sport in Otago